Buck Mountain is a mountain located in Adirondack Mountains of New York located in the Town of Indian Lake northeast of Blue Mountain Lake.

References

Mountains of Hamilton County, New York
Mountains of New York (state)